The 121st Infantry Regiment (121e régiment d'infanterie de ligne) was a military unit in the French Army. It was formed in 1794 as the 121e Demi-Brigade de Bataille, merging the 1st battalion of the 62nd Infantry Regiment, the 1st battalion of volontaires de l'Union and the 7th battalion of the volontaires du Var. The 39e Demi-Brigade d'Infanterie de Ligne was merged into it in 1796.

It was re-formed in 1809 as the 121st Line Infantry Regiment, using the survivors from the 1st and 2nd reserve legions raised in 1807. It was disbanded in 1814, but went on to fight in World War I. It was disbanded after the conflict only to be re-raised again in January 1945 with men from the FFI de l'Allier in the Montluçon region.

See also 
 List of French Army regiments

Bibliography
Recueil d'Historiques de l'Infanterie Française (Général Andolenko - Eurimprim 1969)

Military units and formations of France in World War I